Europa (minor planet designation: 52 Europa) is the 6th-largest asteroid in the asteroid belt, having a diameter of over 300 km, though it is not correspondingly massive. It is not round but is shaped like an ellipsoid of approximately 380×330×250 km. It was discovered on 4 February 1858, by Hermann Goldschmidt from his balcony in Paris. It is named after Europa, one of Zeus's conquests in Greek mythology, a name it shares with Jupiter's moon Europa.

Physical characteristics

Europa is approximately the sixth largest asteroid by volume. Most likely it has a density of around 1.5 g/cm3, typical of C-type asteroids. In 2007, James Baer and Steven R. Chesley estimated Europa to have a mass of  kg. A more recent estimate by Baer suggests it has a mass of 3.27 kg.

Europa is a very dark carbonaceous C-type, and is the second largest of this group. Spectroscopic studies have found evidence of olivines and pyroxenes on the surface, and there is some indication that there may be compositional differences between different regions It orbits close to the Hygiea asteroid family, but is not a member.

Lightcurve data for Europa have been particularly tricky to interpret, so much so that for a long time its period of rotation was in dispute (ranging from  hours to 11 hours), despite numerous observations. It has now been determined that Europa is a prograde rotator, but the exact direction in which its pole points remains ambiguous. The most detailed analysis indicates that it points either towards about ecliptic coordinates (β, λ) = (70°, 55°) or (40°, 255°) with a 10° uncertainty. This gives an axial tilt of about 14° or 54°, respectively.

In 1988 a search for satellites or dust orbiting this asteroid was performed using the UH88 telescope at the Mauna Kea Observatories, but the effort came up empty.

Observations
It has been found that the reputed cataclysmic variable star CV Aquarii, discovered in 1934, was actually a misidentification of 52 Europa.

Notes

References

Bibliography 
 PDS lightcurve data
 
 Schmeer, P., and M. L. Hazen, CV Aquarii identified with (52) Europa, Journal of the American Association of Variable Star Observers, Vol. 28, p. 103 (2000).

External links 
 
 shape model deduced from lightcurve
 
 

Hygiea asteroids
Europa
Europa
CF-type asteroids (Tholen)
C-type asteroids (SMASS)
18580204